(Marcus Aurelius) Valerius Romulus (died 309 AD), was the son of Emperor Maxentius and of Valeria Maximilla, daughter of Emperor Galerius by his first wife. Through his father, he was also grandson of Maximian the Tetrarch, whom he predeceased.

Biography
Valerius bore the title clarissimus puer in his youth, and later nobilissimus vir. He was consul with his father in 308 and 309; the fact that Maxentius was the only consul for year 310 suggests that Valerius died in 309. He was buried in a tomb along the Via Appia. After death, his status was raised to Divus and his father dedicated the Temple of Divus Romulus to him along the Via Sacra near the Roman Forum. Also, a series of commemorative coins was issued in his name, showing a domed shrine with one of the doors ajar, and an eagle on top.

References

Sources 
 DiMaio, Michael, "Maxentius (306–312 A.D.)", De Imperatoribus Romanis

External links 

309 deaths

Year of birth unknown
3rd-century Romans
4th-century Romans
Constantinian dynasty
Deified Roman people
Imperial Roman consuls
Nobilissimi
Valerii
Sons of Roman emperors